Gugark (Greek: Γογαρινή) was the 13th province of the ancient kingdom of Armenia. It now comprises parts of northern Armenia, northeast Turkey, and southwest Georgia.

Etymology 
Etymologically, Gugark in Armenian language denotes land of Gugars. word "Gugar" being a root and suffix -k meaning "land of".

History
At first, according to ancient Urartian inscriptions recorded in 785 BC, territory of Gugark was referred to as Zabaha, which is known today as Javakheti (Javakh in Armenian). In the beginning of IV century BC, (302BC) the territory was under Caucasian Iberia, but during Artaxias I's reign it was conquered. During the reign of the Artaxiad and Arshakuni kings of Armenia, Gugark was ruled by one of the kingdom's four bdeshkhs. The bdeshkh of Gugark was responsible for protecting the state's northern border. During the 4th century, the region was ruled by members of a branch of the House of Mihran. In 387, Armenia was partitioned between the Byzantine and Sassanid empires and Gugark, with the exception of the canton of Tashir, was annexed to Caucasian Iberia. The ruler of the region around 425 was Archoucha (Arshusha of Gogarene). In 652, the Armenian prince Theodore Rshtuni was allowed by the Arabs to unite Gugark with his realms. 

In the following centuries, Gugark and its cantons fell under the sway of several rulers. In the 8th century, it became a part of Emirate of Tbilisi. In the middle of the 9th century, it was taken by the Georgian Bagrationis, while the Armenian Bagratunis took over its eastern cantons.

Inhabitants 
Armenian catholicos Hovhannes Draskhanakerttsi says in his books that the majority of this region was Armenian people with minority of Iberian people. Also an Armenian historian Ghazar Parpetsi mentions Arshusha V pitiakhsh of Iberians.

Cantons 

 Dzoropor
 Tsobopor
 Treghk
 Artahan
 Javakhk
 Upper Javakhk
 Tashir
 Kangark
 Kagharjk
 Nigal
 Mrugh
 Mrit 
 Shavshet
 Koghbopor
 Kvishapor
 Boghnopor
 Tashran 
 Manglyats 
 Ashotsk

List of bdeshkhs 
Based on available sources, Cyril Toumanoff deduced an incomplete list of the ruling Mihranid bdeshkhs of Gugark.

See also
Shushanik

References

External links

Provinces of the Kingdom of Armenia (antiquity)
History of Ardahan Province